Giovanni Silva de Oliveira (born 4 February 1972), better known as Giovanni, is a Brazilian football manager and former player. He played as either an attacking midfielder or a forward.

At club level, Giovanni most notably played for Spanish side Barcelona, Greek side Olympiacos, and Brazilian club Santos. Internationally, he played for the Brazil national team, gaining 18 caps and scoring 6 goals; he was part of the Brazilian team that reached the 1998 FIFA World Cup Final.

In his prime, Giovanni was one of Barcelona's most valuable players, but after the arrival of Louis van Gaal at the club, he got into conflict with the Dutch manager, along with fellow Brazilians Rivaldo (whom van Gaal wanted to use as a left winger, despite his protests) and Sonny Anderson. He famously called van Gaal "a Hitler for Brazilians, and an egomaniac". At Olympiacos Giovanni had the happiest and most successful days of his career, and is still remembered as a club legend by supporters.

Club career

Early career 
Born in Belém but raised in Abaetetuba, Pará, Giovanni started his career with lowly amateurs Taça Luz in 1990, and moved to Tuna Luso shortly after. After impressing in the youth setup, he made his first team debut in a 2–1 Copa do Brasil win over CSA, scoring a brace.

In 1993, he was loaned to Série A side Remo, but could not repeat the same success.

In 1994, after a very brief period where he featured in two friendly matches for Paysandu (where he considered quitting the sport), Giovanni played for Sãocarlense in the Campeonato Paulista Série A2. He played only four matches in two months, and was subsequently set to move to Palmeiras; however, after becoming ill while waiting for his medical, he returned to his hometown and the move never materialized.

Santos 
As his last match for Sãocarlense was televised, Giovanni impressed Santos president Samir Abdul-Hak, who decided to sign him on loan until the end of the year. He made his debut for the club on 25 September, replacing Ranielli in a 4–1 away success over former club Remo, and scored his first goal on 30 October in a 1–0 win over Paraná.

For the 1995 season, Giovanni was bought by Santos, with club legend Pelé himself funding his transfer. A starter during the 1995 Campeonato Paulista, he scored a hat-trick in a 4–1 home routing of Ponte Preta. He repeated the feat on 20 October, in a victory over Grêmio for the same scoreline.

Giovanni scored 17 goals in the 1995 Série A as Santos finished runners-up in the tournament; in the semi-finals against Fluminense, Santos lost 4–1 in the first leg away, and Giovanni dyed his hair red to show faith in the team. He displayed a splendid game in the second leg and Santos managed to win 5–2, with Giovanni scoring twice and assisting the club's final goal, which was scored by Marcelo Passos. Unfortunately, he could not help Santos overcome Botafogo in the final game. Nonetheless, he is still known to many Santos supporters as "Messias" (Messiah) and his fans named themselves "Giovanni's Witnesses" – a reference to the religion "Jehovah's Witnesses".

On 7 April 1996, Giovanni scored four goals in a 8–2 win over União São João. He scored two hat-tricks against Ferroviária and Araçatuba, and finished the 1996 Paulista as the top scorer with 24 goals.

Barcelona 
On 18 June 1996, Giovanni moved abroad for the first time in his career, after signing with Spanish club Barcelona, for a rumoured fee of US$ 7.8 million. He was a first team regular for two seasons and scored 18 goals overall. Barcelona fans still remember him for his ability to score game-winning goals against rivals Real Madrid. In his first year with Barcelona he won the 1996–97 UEFA Cup Winners' Cup under manager Bobby Robson. When Louis van Gaal took the lead in his third year at the club, however, he eventually fell out of favour with the Dutch manager, along with compatriot Sonny Anderson, despite scoring crucial goals in games such as the 1997 UEFA Super Cup second leg game against Borussia Dortmund. Due to his poor relationship with van Gaal, Giovanni left for Greek club Olympiacos in the summer of 1999, for a record transfer fee of £10,800,000. Later on in his career, he caused some controversy, by referring to van Gaal as a Hitler for Brazilians, and an egomaniac.

Olympiacos 
 
In Greece, Giovanni soon established himself as one of the best players of the Greek league.

A flamboyant striker, he was known for his inventive dribbling, passing range, and ability to lob the goalkeeper, as well as for having a penchant to beat opposing defenders by passing the ball through their legs (a move known as the nutmeg). His technique on the ball and the variety of fascinating moves he deployed during matches saw him become a highly popular player and a heroic figure to the Olympiacos fans, and he is regarded as one of the club's best ever players. His talent and skills earned him the nickname "magos" (μάγος) "wizard" in Greece.

On 20 May 2002, Giovanni renewed with Olympiacos for three years. He was the leading goalscorer in Greece in the 2003–04 season with 21 goals.

Santos return 
On 27 May 2005, Santos confirmed the return of Giovanni. During the season, he appeared in 29 games and scored four goals, but after only one match into the 2006 campaign, he was told to leave by manager Vanderlei Luxemburgo.

Late career 
After his short return to Brazil, Giovanni played for several clubs abroad, such as  Saudi Arabian side Al-Hilal, Greek club Ethnikos, before returning to Brazil to play for Sport Recife in April 2007. However, weeks after arriving at the latter, he left the club as manager Alexandre Gallo also departed.

In November 2008, after more than a year without playing, Giovanni was convinced to come out of retirement by his friend Rivaldo, and signed for Mogi Mirim.

Second return to Santos 
After passing the team's medical exams, Giovanni returned to Santos on 13 January 2010, with a contract until August. Although he played very few matches for the club, he finally managed to win his first title with Santos, the Campeonato Paulista. In June 2010 season, he announced his retirement from professional football.

International career 
Giovanni earned 18 caps with the Brazil national team, scoring six goals for the "seleção". He was a member of the team that won the 1997 Copa América, and also represented his Country during the 1998 World Cup in France, where Brazil went on to reach the final, only to suffer a 3–0 defeat to the host nation.

Style of play 
A versatile playmaker, his natural and favorite position was as an attacking midfielder, but he could also play as a forward, being an exceptional goalscorer. He was predominantly known for his world-class technique, his exceptional dribbling skills, and his outstanding flair and creativity on the ball, which saw him employ a variety of crafty moves, as well as his passing accuracy and goalscoring ability.

Career statistics

Club

International

International goals

Honours

Club 
Barcelona
 La Liga: 1997–98, 1998–99
 Copa del Rey: 1996–97, 1997–98 
 Supercopa de España: 1996
 UEFA Cup Winners' Cup: 1996–97
 UEFA Super Cup: 1997

Olympiacos
 Alpha Ethniki: 1999–2000, 2000–01, 2001–02, 2002–03, 2004–05
 Greek Cup: 2004–05; runner-up: 2000–01, 2001–02, 2003–04

Al-Hilal
 Saudi Crown Prince Cup: 2005–06
 Prince Faisal Bin Fahad Cup: 2005–06

Santos
 Copa do Brasil: 2010
 Campeonato Paulista: 2006, 2010

International 
Brazil
 Copa América: 1997
 Umbro Cup: 1995
 FIFA World Cup runner-up: 1998

Individual 
 Bola de Ouro: 1995 
 Bola de Prata: 1995 
 Greek Championship Foreign Footballer of the Year: 1999–2000, 2003–04
 Greek Championship Top goalscorer: 2003–04 
Greek Cup Top goalscorer: 2000–01
 The Golden Greek football Rosters: Decade 2000–2010

References

External links 

Giovanni Silva de Oliveira

1972 births
Living people
Brazilian footballers
Association football midfielders
Association football forwards
Campeonato Brasileiro Série C players
Campeonato Brasileiro Série B players
Campeonato Brasileiro Série A players
La Liga players
Super League Greece players
Saudi Professional League players
Tuna Luso Brasileira players
Clube do Remo players
Paysandu Sport Club players
Grêmio Esportivo Sãocarlense players
Santos FC players
FC Barcelona players
Olympiacos F.C. players
Al Hilal SFC players
Ethnikos Piraeus F.C. players
Sport Club do Recife players
Mogi Mirim Esporte Clube players
Brazil international footballers
1997 Copa América players
1998 FIFA World Cup players
Copa América-winning players
Brazilian expatriate footballers
Brazilian expatriate sportspeople in Spain
Brazilian expatriate sportspeople in Greece
Brazilian expatriate sportspeople in Saudi Arabia
Expatriate footballers in Spain
Expatriate footballers in Greece
Expatriate footballers in Saudi Arabia
Sportspeople from Belém